The Martigny–Châtelard Railway, abbreviated MC, French Chemins de fer Martigny–Châtelard, is a    rack railway in the canton of Valais, Switzerland.
The transport company "Chemin de fer de Martigny–Châtelard" merged in 2001, the resulting Transports de Martigny et Régions now markets this line and the connecting Saint-Gervais–Vallorcine railway as Mont-Blanc Express.

Contact with the other networks 
 At Martigny it connects with the Lausanne–Brig line of the Swiss Federal Railways
 At Le Châtelard (Finhaut) it connects with the Saint-Gervais–Vallorcine railway which in turn joins the standard gauge SNCF at Le Fayet station of Saint-Gervais-les-Bains.

Rolling stock 
 2 Z 800 105-seater electric multiple units, delivered in 1997 (???) by ADTranz and Vevey Technologies, in the context of a joint purchase with the Ligne de Saint Gervais - Vallorcine.

Merger with MO 

This transport company merged 2001 with the Martigny–Orsières Railway and is now known as "Transports de Martigny et Régions".

See also
List of mountain railways in Switzerland

References 

Metre gauge railways in Switzerland
Railway lines in Switzerland
Mountain railways
Rack railways in Switzerland
Transports de Martigny et Régions